South Campus or Campus South or variation, may refer to:

Places
 South Campus station (disambiguation)
 South Campus Neighborhood, Chico, California, US
 Southside, Berkeley, California, US, a neighborhood also known as South Campus

Education
 South Campus (University of Copenhagen), Denmark
 Banaras Hindu University, South campus, Uttar Pradesh, India
 Florida Community College South Campus, US

Other uses
 Staten Island University Hospital South Campus (formerly Richmond Memorial Hospital) aka "South Campus"